Bill Lieschke (17 November 1944 – 16 January 2015) was an Australian rules footballer who played with Essendon in the Victorian Football League (VFL). Lieschke rejoined one of his old clubs, Albury, after his time with the Bombers. He also played with Acton and Natimuk before becoming an umpire.

Notes

External links 
		

Essendon Football Club past player profile

1944 births
2015 deaths
Australian rules footballers from Victoria (Australia)
Essendon Football Club players
Albury Football Club players
Acton Football Club players
Australian rules football umpires